Stephanie Nampiina (born 12 March 2000) is a Ugandan women's cricketer. 
In July 2018, she was named in Uganda's squad for the 2018 ICC Women's World Twenty20 Qualifier tournament. She made her WT20I debut against Thailand on 8 July 2018.

In April 2019, she was named in Uganda's squad for the 2019 ICC Women's Qualifier Africa tournament in Zimbabwe.

References

External links
 

2000 births
Living people
Ugandan women cricketers
Uganda women Twenty20 International cricketers